Early Branch is a stream in Pike County in the U.S. state of Missouri. It is a tributary of Sugar Creek.

Early Branch has the name of Henry Early, a pioneer settler.

See also
List of rivers of Missouri

References

Rivers of Pike County, Missouri
Rivers of Missouri